Pinzona is a monotypic genus of flowering plants belonging to the family Dilleniaceae. It only contains one known species, Pinzona coriacea Mart. & Zucc.

Its native range is Tropical America. It is found in Belize, Bolivia, Brazil (northern), Colombia, Costa Rica, Dominican Republic, Ecuador, French Guiana, Guyana, Honduras, the Leeward Islands, Nicaragua, Panamá, Peru, Suriname, Trinidad-Tobago, Venezuela and the Windward Islands.
 
The genus name of Pinzona is in honour of Vicente Yáñez Pinzón (c. 1462 – after 1514), a Spanish navigator and explorer, the youngest of the Pinzón brothers. Along with his older brother, Martín Alonso Pinzón (c. 1441 – c. 1493), who captained the Pinta, he sailed with Christopher Columbus on the first voyage to the New World, in 1492, as captain of the Niña. The Latin specific epithet of coriacea means 
leather-like from corium. Both the genus and the specied were first described and published in Abh. Math.-Phys. Cl. Königl. Bayer. Akad. Wiss. Vol.1 on page 371 (1829-1830, published in 1832).

References

Dilleniaceae
Eudicot genera
Plants described in 1832
Flora of Central America
Flora of Trinidad and Tobago
Flora of the Windward Islands
Flora of the Leeward Islands
Flora of northern South America
Flora of western South America
Flora of North Brazil
Flora without expected TNC conservation status